
Russian interest in J. R. R. Tolkien's The Lord of the Rings awoke soon after its publication in 1955, long before the first Russian translation.

The first effort at publication was made in the 1960s, but in order to comply with literary censorship in Soviet Russia, the work was considerably abridged and transformed. The ideological danger of the book was seen in the "hidden allegory 'of the conflict between the individualist West and the totalitarian, Communist East, while Marxist readings in the west conversely identified Tolkien's anti-industrial ideas as presented in the Shire with primitive communism, in a struggle with the evil forces of technocratic capitalism.

Russian translations of The Lord of the Rings circulated as samizdat and were published only after the collapse of the Soviet Union, but then in great numbers; no less than ten official Russian translations appeared between 1990 and 2005. Tolkien fandom in Russia grew especially rapidly during the early 1990s at Moscow State University. Many unofficial and partly fragmentary translations are in circulation. The first translation appearing in print was that by Kistyakovskij and Muravyov (volume 1, published 1982).

Russian translations and retellings of The Lord of the Rings:

See also 

 Translations of The Lord of the Rings
 The Last Ringbearer
 Khraniteli

References

Sources 
 Mark T. Hooker, Tolkien Through Russian Eyes, Walking Tree Publishers, 2003. .

Further reading 
 

Russian
Lord of the Rings, The
Translations into Russian
Censorship in the Soviet Union

ru:Властелин колец#Переводы и пересказы на русский язык